Craig Gentry (born 1973) is an American computer scientist working as CTO of TripleBlind. He is best known for his work in cryptography, specifically fully homomorphic encryption.

Education 
In 1993, while studying at Duke University, he became a Putnam Fellow. In 2009, his dissertation, in which he constructed the first Fully Homomorphic Encryption scheme, won the ACM Doctoral Dissertation Award.

Career 
In 2010, he won the ACM Grace Murray Hopper Award for the same work. In 2014, he won a MacArthur Fellowship. Previously, he was a research scientist at the Algorand Foundation and IBM Thomas J. Watson Research Center.

References

1973 births
Living people
MacArthur Fellows
Duke University alumni
Harvard Law School alumni
Stanford University alumni
Grace Murray Hopper Award laureates
IBM Research computer scientists
Putnam Fellows